Guy Grossmith (born 8 September 1952) is a Zimbabwean sailor. He competed in the Finn event at the 1984 Summer Olympics.

References

External links
 

1952 births
Living people
Zimbabwean male sailors (sport)
Olympic sailors of Zimbabwe
Sailors at the 1984 Summer Olympics – Finn
Place of birth missing (living people)